Hauser Mansion is a historic house in Helena, Montana, U.S.. It was built in 1885 for Governor Samuel Thomas Hauser. It was designed by the architectural firm Wallace & Thornburg. It was inherited by his daughter, Ellen Hauser Thatcher, in 1913, and subsequently sold to the Roman Catholic Bishop of Helena, John P. Carroll, followed by other bishops. From 1935 to 1969, it was used by the Sisters of Charity of Leavenworth. It was purchased by Governor Tim Babcock in 1969. It has been listed on the National Register of Historic Places since February 12, 1979.

References

Houses on the National Register of Historic Places in Montana
Houses completed in 1885
Houses in Lewis and Clark County, Montana
1885 establishments in Montana Territory
National Register of Historic Places in Helena, Montana